The Coalition of Independent Nationals (COIN) is a former political party in Fiji, which never won parliamentary representation. The party won less than 0.1% of the popular vote. It was originally a grouping of six candidates styling themselves as independents, in the 1999 election and was led by  Prince Vyas Muni Lakshman.

Defunct political parties in Fiji